David Evan Roberts CBE (born 25 May 1980), is a Welsh swimmer. An eleven-time Paralympic gold medallist, he is one of Great Britain's most successful Paralympians ever.

His achievements put him in 34th place on the all time list of Paralympic Gold Medallists

Swimming career

Roberts went to Llwyncrwn Primary School and moved on to Bryn Celynnog Comprehensive School. He currently lives in Cardiff. He is a professional disabled swimmer who represents Caerphilly County Swim Squad, Wales and Great Britain. He previously trained at the Swansea High Performance Centre at the Wales National Pool in Swansea but now trains with Caerphilly County Swim Squad with his new coach Peter Key. He was diagnosed with cerebral palsy at age eleven and was encouraged to participate in swimming activities as a form of physical therapy. His International Paralympic Committee (IPC) swimming category is S7 SB7 SM7.

His first represented Wales in competition in Glasgow in 1993. His first major competition for Great Britain was at the 1999 European Disabled swimming Championships in Braunschweig, Germany where he won all four of his races. He competed in his first Paralympic Games in Sydney in the summer of 2000. Here he won an impressive haul of seven medals.

At the 2001 European Disabled Swimming Championships in Stockholm, Sweden, David won five gold medals including a clean sweep of the S7 50 m, 100 m and 400 m freestyle events.

The Manchester 2002 Commonwealth Games saw Elite Athletes with Disabilities (EAD) competing alongside able-bodied athletes at a major competition for the first time. David was the only disabled swimmer from Great Britain to win a medal, taking the bronze in the men's multi disability 100 m freestyle.

Roberts won his first IPC World Swimming Championship medals in Mar Del Plata, Argentina in December 2002. He won three gold medals, one silver and one bronze.

His second experience of Paralympic action came at the Athens 2004 Summer Paralympics. Here David won four golds and one silver. His medals came in the following events:

Men's 50 m freestyle S7 – Gold
Men's 100 m freestyle S7 – Gold
Men's 400 m freestyle S7 – Gold
Men's 200 m individual medley SM7 – Silver
Men's 4 × 100 m freestyle relay 34 pts – Gold

His achievements at the 2000 and 2004 Paralympics, alongside his previous successes for Great Britain, earned David an MBE for his services to disabled sport in the Queen's New Years Honours. He received his award from the Queen at Buckingham Palace in March 2005. He also made it onto the shortlist of the 2004 BBC Wales Sports Personality of the Year Award which was won by Dame Tanni Grey-Thompson.

David retained his Commonwealth Games men's multi disability 100 m freestyle bronze medal at the 2006 event held in Melbourne, Australia. At the 2006 IPC World Swimming Championships, held in Durban, South Africa, he won four gold, 1 silver and a bronze. Included in the medal haul was another clean sweep in the S7 freestyle events.

The first half of 2008 saw David set new world records for the S7 50 m, 100 m, 200 m and 400 m freestyle events in the space of six weeks. He retained his S7 50 m freestyle World record off Great Britain rival Matthew Walker in April at the British Swimming Championships in Sheffield setting a new time of 27.67. At the same event he lowered his S7 100 m freestyle world record to a new time of 1:00.34.

He set a new S7 200 m world record of 2:18.86 at the German Open Championships in May 2008. For the first time in his career he finally took the S7 400 m freestyle world record, which had been held by Dean Booth from New Zealand for eight years previously, at the British International Swimming Championships held in Sheffield in April, recording a time of 4:49.12.

He achieved selection for his third consecutive Paralympics in May 2008 by being named as part of the squad to attend the Beijing Paralympics.

He won four gold medals at the Beijing 2008 Paralympic Games taking the S7 50 m, 100 m and 400 m freestyle events and was part of the gold medal-winning Great Britain 34 point 4×100 m freestyle relay team that broke the world record by seven seconds. Other members of the team were Graham Edmunds, Robert Welbourn and Matthew Walker.

To show support for his, at the time, coach Billy Pye, who supports Cardiff City Roberts performed The Ayatollah in front of the Western Mail reporters to celebrate winning his 11th gold medal. David is a keen supporter of Wrexham FC and regularly attends games as a supporter of Welsh rugby team, Bridgend Ravens. In winning this 11th gold, David Roberts equalled Dame Tanni Grey-Thompson's record as being Wales and Britain's most successful Paralympian.

After winning four golds in the Beijing 2008 Paralympics, David was selected to carry out the British flag at the closing ceremony.

He appeared as a guest on an episode of the popular British TV sports quiz Question of Sport which aired on Friday 24 October 2008 on BBC One. He took a seat alongside regular team captain Matt Dawson and guest teammate, English cricketer Marcus Trescothick.

He was nominated for the BBC Wales Sports Personality of the Year Awards for the second time in December 2008.

Already a Member of the Order of the British Empire (MBE), Roberts was appointed Commander of the Order of the British Empire (CBE) in the 2009 New Year Honours for services to disabled sport. He received his CBE off Princess Anne in a ceremony held at Buckingham Palace on Wednesday 24 June 2009.

David was inducted into the Welsh Sports Hall of Fame along with J.J. Williams and Clive Sullivan at a ceremony held in Cardiff on 5 June 2009.

Penn Pharmaceuticals were the first corporate sponsor of David, from 2008 to date

At the start of 2010, David made the move from the Swansea High Performance Centre to Caerphilly County Swim Squad and a new coach in Peter Key. On 4 March 2010 David was chosen to be a patron of the Jaguar Sports Academy. In August 2010 he once again represented Britain at the IPC World Swimming Championships, which were held in Eindhoven in the Netherlands. Despite only recently returning to action after a period of prolonged injury and illness, he still managed to retain his S7 100m Freestyle crown, alongside picking up a silver and two bronze medals. He was selected and competed for Wales at the Delhi 2010 Commonwealth Games, coming 4th in the S7 100m Freestyle, an event which saw him swim against competitors a class higher than his own.

In April 2012 Roberts was omitted from the GB Swimming Team for the Paralympics at London 2012 because he did not meet his qualifying times due to having pneumonia three weeks before the trials.

He proposed to his long-term partner Agata Jankowska on a holiday trip to New York in October 2010. On 11 March he was invited to address the Human Rights Council in Geneva on London 2012 and the rights of people with disabilities.

He was selected to carry the Paralympic flame through Tower Hamlets on 29 August at 1:07pm.

See also
List of IPC world records in swimming
Athletes with most gold medals in one event at the Paralympic Games

References

C4 Paralympics http://paralympics.channel4.com/inside-stories/newsid=1232671/

External links
 

1980 births
Living people
Sportspeople from Pontypridd
Welsh male swimmers
Paralympic swimmers of Great Britain
Paralympic gold medalists for Great Britain
Paralympic silver medalists for Great Britain
Paralympic bronze medalists for Great Britain
Swimmers at the 2000 Summer Paralympics
Swimmers at the 2004 Summer Paralympics
Swimmers at the 2008 Summer Paralympics
Medalists at the 2000 Summer Paralympics
Medalists at the 2004 Summer Paralympics
Medalists at the 2008 Summer Paralympics
Commonwealth Games medallists in swimming
Commonwealth Games bronze medallists for Wales
Swimmers at the 2002 Commonwealth Games
Swimmers at the 2006 Commonwealth Games
World record holders in paralympic swimming
Commanders of the Order of the British Empire
S7-classified Paralympic swimmers
Medalists at the World Para Swimming Championships
Paralympic medalists in swimming
British male freestyle swimmers
Medallists at the 2002 Commonwealth Games
Medallists at the 2006 Commonwealth Games